Hapanvelli (Finnish lit. 'sour gruel') is a traditional South-Eastern Finnish dish that resembles pea soup but has a more sour flavour. It takes roughly an hour to prepare hapanvelli, which is made from a rye sourdough starter, potatoes and peas. It is traditionally served with a pat of butter and cold milk.

Hapanvelli is a traditional dish of the Virolahti municipality which has the annual summertime Virolahti Week (Virolahti-viikko) during which hapanvelli is sold. There is also a contest during Virolahti Week in which the best cook gets the title of Miss Hapanvelli (Hapanvellimissi).

See also

 List of porridges
 Sour rye soup

References

External links
 Glossary of Finnish Dishes 

Finnish cuisine
Porridges
Fermented foods
Rye-based dishes